The 1983 Cup of the Soviet Army Final was the 1st final of the Cup of the Soviet Army (as a secondary cup tournament in Bulgaria), and was contested between Lokomotiv Plovdiv and Chirpan on 1 June 1983 at Vasil Levski National Stadium in Sofia. Lokomotiv won the final 3–1.

Match

Details

References

Football cup competitions in Bulgaria
1982–83 in Bulgarian football
PFC Lokomotiv Plovdiv matches